Minervarya charlesdarwini (vernacular name: Charles Darwin's frog) is a species of frogs in the family Dicroglossidae. It is endemic to the Andaman Islands, India, and is known from the South Andaman Island, Long Island, and North Andaman Island.

Taxonomy
However, this taxonomic placement was always considered uncertain. In 2022, a phylogenetic study found it to be a sister species to the Andaman frog (M. andamanensis), another endemic frog of the Andamans, and it was thus reclassified into the genus Minervarya.

Following the description of this species, specimens labelled as Rana doriae andamanensis collected by Nelson Annandale were found from the Zoological Survey of India. However, Annandale never formally described a taxon using that name, so it is an unavailable name.

Description
Adult males measure  and adult females  in snout–vent length. The snout is rounded and has a blunt tip. The tympanum is distinct and exposed; the supra-tympanic fold is well-developed and forms a thick, fleshy ridge. The fingers have no webbing whereas the toes are partially webbed. The finger and toe tips bear swollen discs, without circum-marginal grooves. Skin has minute granules scattered all over the dorsum; the venter is smooth. Colouration is variable with three different morphs:
 The first morph is dull olive brown but has a bright orange butterfly-like marking on the dorsum behind the occiput, and a smaller spot of the same colour above the sacral region. Only very feeble black subocular spots are present, and the limbs lack barred pattern.
 The second type is light tan and has very distinct black bars on the limbs. The dorsum has only a feeble W-like marking on the mid-dorsum and two indistinct orange spots. A mid-dorsal stripe might be present. Under moist conditions, the colour turns dark brown. Males have a dark gular vocal sac.
 The third morph, which is similar to the holotype, is bright creamy white but with a dark brown patch on the dorsum as well as very thin, creamy white mid-dorsal stripe and two distinct, white subocular spots. Again, males have a dark gular vocal sac.

Habitat and conservation
Minervarya charlesdarwini have been found in primary evergreen and secondary forests at elevations below . The eggs are laid in water-filled tree holes. It is threatened by habitat loss (clear-cutting). The type series was collected in the Mount Harriet National Park, and the species is also known from the Saddle Peak National Park.

References

charlesdarwini
Frogs of India
Endemic fauna of the Andaman Islands
Amphibians described in 1998
Taxonomy articles created by Polbot